Ben Chiarot (born May 9, 1991) is a Canadian professional ice hockey defenceman for the Detroit Red Wings of the National Hockey League (NHL). Chiarot was drafted 120th overall by the Atlanta Thrashers in the 2009 NHL Entry Draft. He has previously played for the Winnipeg Jets, Montreal Canadiens and Florida Panthers.

Early life 
Chiarot was born on May 9, 1991, in Hamilton, Ontario, to Tara and Matt Chiarot. Canadian football ran in the Chiarot family: his grandfather Gord played for the Hamilton Tiger-Cats and BC Lions of the Canadian Football League, while his father and uncle played college football for McMaster University. Chiarot's father refused to allow him to play football as a child, however, and he focused on ice hockey instead. Chiarot played minor ice hockey as a defenceman for the Mississauga IceDogs of the Greater Toronto Hockey League. In his final season with the team, he recorded 22 goals and 64 points in 75 regular season games, as well as five points in seven OHL Cup games.

Playing career

Junior
Chiarot played major junior hockey in the Ontario Hockey League (OHL) with the Guelph Storm, Sudbury Wolves, and Saginaw Spirit.

Professional

Winnipeg Jets

He was selected by the Atlanta Thrashers in the 4th round (120th overall) of the 2009 NHL Entry Draft, and made his professional debut in the American Hockey League with the Chicago Wolves during the 2009–10 season. On March 16, 2011, the Atlanta Thrashers signed Chiarot to an entry level contract.  On July 23, 2014, Chiarot signed a two-way deal, worth $600,000 with the Jets, after a strong campaign with the St. John's IceCaps of the American Hockey League. Chiarot scored his first NHL goal on January 3, 2015, in a 5-1 win over the Toronto Maple Leafs.

On June 18, 2015, the Winnipeg Jets resigned Chiarot to a two-year, $1.7 million contract extension.

On June 24, 2017, the Jets re-signed Chiarot to a two-year, $2.8 million contract extension with an annual average of $1.4 million.

Montreal Canadiens
After spending the first eight seasons of his professional career within the Thrashers/Jets franchise, Chiarot left as a free agent following the 2018–19 season to a sign a three-year, $10.5 million contract with the Montreal Canadiens on July 4, 2019. Later, on October 9, 2019, Chiarot scored his first goal with Montreal in a 5-4 overtime loss to the Buffalo Sabres. In his first season in Montreal, he managed a new personal best of 9 goals and 12 assists in 69 games.

While playing with the Canadiens over the course of the contract, Chiarot assumed an increasingly prominent role in their defense corps, notably participating in the team's deep run to the 2021 Stanley Cup Finals, where they lost to the Tampa Bay Lightning. He led the Canadiens in ice time during the playoffs. He later remarked "getting to the Finals is the pinnacle of what hockey is when you're playing for the Stanley Cup and it's down to two teams. I'll always be grateful that I had that experience because it's not one that everybody gets."

Entering the final season of his contract, he became the subject of increasing speculation that he would be traded before the deadline in order to secure the Canadiens more picks in the 2022 NHL Entry Draft. Chiarot recorded 18 points in 54 games with the Canadiens, the last being an assist on the game-tying shorthanded goal in the final minute of the third period of a March 13 game against the Philadelphia Flyers, leading to a 4–3 Canadiens victory in overtime. On March 15, coach Martin St. Louis announced that he would sit out the remaining games in advance of the trade deadline to avoid injury.

Florida Panthers
On March 16, 2022, Chiarot was traded by the Canadiens to the Florida Panthers, for prospect Tyler Smilanic, a 2023 first-round pick, and a 2022 fourth-round pick. Following the trade, Chiarot remained in Montreal rather than joining the team on the road, and made his debut with the club on March 24 in a game against the Canadiens. He registered his first assist with the team in the game, contributing to a 4–3 Panthers victory. The Panthers won the Presidents' Trophy with the best regular season record in the NHL, and qualified for the 2022 Stanley Cup playoffs. Chiarot assumed a prominent role in the Panthers' defense during their first round series against the Washington Capitals, where they prevailed 4 games to 2, advancing to the second round for the first time in a quarter century. Chariot was fined for head-butting Tampa Bay Lightning forward Ross Colton in Game 1 of the second round. The Panthers were swept by the Lightning, bringing their playoffs to an end.

Detroit Red Wings
On July 13, 2022, Chiarot signed a four-year, $19 million contract with the Detroit Red Wings.

Career statistics

References

External links

1991 births
Living people
Atlanta Thrashers draft picks
Canadian expatriate ice hockey players in the United States
Canadian ice hockey defencemen
Chicago Wolves players
Colorado Eagles players
Detroit Red Wings players
Florida Panthers players
Guelph Storm players
Montreal Canadiens players
Saginaw Spirit players
Sportspeople from Hamilton, Ontario
St. John's IceCaps players
Sudbury Wolves players
Winnipeg Jets players